Life of the Party is the third full-length release by the Planet Smashers, released in 1999.

Critical reception
The Gazette wrote: "Their most polished album, Life of the Party returns to the slick songwriting style popularized by the likes of the English Beat in their short but prolific career."

Track listing
"Life of the Party"  – 2:24
"Shame"  – 2:40
"Too Much Attitude"  – 2:48
"Swayed"  – 3:04
"Surfin' in Tofino"  – 2:31
"All Men Fear Women"  – 2:45
"You Might Be..."  – 2:18
"Trouble in Engineering"  – 2:28
"Super Orgy Porno Party"  – 2:35
"Wise Up"  – 2:36
"Whining"  – 2:46
"No Matter What You Say"  – 4:03
"Kung Fu Master"  – 2:58
"Holiday"  – 2:40
"Save It"  – 3:19

References

1999 albums
The Planet Smashers albums